The United Kingdom participated in the Eurovision Song Contest 1959. The British Broadcasting Corporation (BBC) organised a national final to select the United Kingdom's entry for the contest. The song selected was "Sing, Little Birdie", performed by Pearl Carr and Teddy Johnson.

Before Eurovision
The song placed 7th in a field of 10 entries.

Eurovision Song Contest British Final 

The Eurovision Song Contest British Final was a national final organised by the BBC to select the United Kingdom's entry for the contest. The selection consisted of two semi-finals held on 2 February and 5 February 1959, and a final held on 7 February 1959, broadcast on BBC Television and presented by Pete Murray.

The songs were scored by seven 14-member regional juries representing the South of England, the Midlands, Northern England, Northern Ireland, Scotland, Wales, and the West of England.

Competing entries
Twelve entries were shortlisted by the BBC for the contest. "I'll Be With You" was originally scheduled to be performed by Alma Cogan, but was replaced by Marion Keene.

Shows

Semi-final 1 
Semi-final 1 was held on 2 February 1959. The highlighted songs qualified for the final.

Semi-final 2
Semi-final 2 was held on 5 February 1959. The highlighted songs qualified for the final.

Final
The final was held on 7 February 1959 at 19:30 GMT.

At Eurovision 
In the final, Pearl Carr and Teddy Johnson performed tenth in the running order, following  and preceding . At the close of the voting "Sing Little Birdie" had received 16 points, placing United Kingdom 2nd in a field of 11 entries.

Voting

References

External links
UK National Final page

1959
Countries in the Eurovision Song Contest 1959
Eurovision Song Contest
Eurovision Song Contest